The Great Northern Railway's class Y-1 comprised eight electric locomotives with AAR 1-C+C-1 wheel arrangements.  The locomotives were used on the  electrified portion of the railroad, from Wenatchee, Washington to Skykomish, Washington, including the Cascade Tunnel.

The  locomotives were built at Schenectady, New York, with car bodies manufactured by American Locomotive Company and electrical components supplied by General Electric. They used motor-generator sets to rectify the alternating current line voltage into direct current for their traction motors.

The GN numbered the units 5010–5017 and classified them Y-1. After being involved in a wreck at Tonga, Washington in July 1945, the 5011 was rebuilt with a streamlined appearance and EMD F-unit cabs; the GN reclassified it as Y-1a.

In 1956, the GN dieselized operations through the Cascade Tunnel. The electrical system was decommissioned, and the Y-1 locomotives were sold to the Pennsylvania Railroad, who classified them as FF2. GN 5011 was broken up for spares, and the remaining seven locomotives were overhauled and converted to PRR standards and then placed into service, being assigned numbers 1–7 on the PRR. They lasted a few more years on the PRR, and were all scrapped between 1957 and 1966.

Fleet roster

References 

 (Simple drawing and specifications, for general reference by railroad staff).
 pages 248–253

1-C+C-1 locomotives
(1′Co)+(Co1′) locomotives

11 kV AC locomotives
General Electric locomotives
Y-1
Electric locomotives of the United States
Scrapped locomotives
Standard gauge locomotives of the United States
Railway locomotives introduced in 1927